Franco Alexis López (born 1 April 1998), is an Argentine footballer who plays as a winger for Los Andes on loan from Argentinos Juniors.

Club career 

López is a youth exponent from River Plate. He made his league debut at 8 June 2015 against Club Olimpo in a 1-1 draw. He replaced Fernando Cavenaghi after 66 minutes.

References

1998 births
Living people
Association football wingers
Argentine footballers
Sportivo Italiano footballers
Club Atlético River Plate footballers
Argentinos Juniors footballers
Club Atlético Los Andes footballers
Deportivo Español footballers
Argentine Primera División players
Primera B Metropolitana players
Sportspeople from Buenos Aires Province